Umfreville is a community in the Kenora District of Ontario, located along Highway 642 southeast of Sioux Lookout.

Communities in Kenora District